Tigran Bekzadyan was an Armenian politician who served as Representative of the First Republic of Armenia in Baku and Tbilisi.

References 

Armenian politicians
People of the First Republic of Armenia
Ambassadors of Armenia to Azerbaijan